Since the founding of the Labour Party in 1900, it has seen a steady number of splits and breakaway factions. Some of the breakaway organisations have thrived as independent parties, some have become defunct, while others have merged back with the parent party or other political parties.

References

External links
 https://voteforchange.uk/

Political schisms

Labour Party (UK)-related lists